Orana is a genus of moths in the subfamily Lymantriinae. The genus was erected by Paul Griveaud in 1976.

Species
Orana delicata Griveaud, 1977
Orana grammodes (Hering, 1926)
Orana palea Griveaud, 1977

References

Lymantriinae